The 2012–13 season will be Oțelul Galați's 21st consecutive season in the Liga I, and their 24th overall season in the top-flight of Romanian football.

Players

Transfers

In

Out

Player statistics

Squad statistics

Start formations

Disciplinary records

Suspensions

Competitions

Overall

{|class="wikitable" style="text-align: center;"
|-
!
!Total
! Home 
! Away
|-
|align=left| Games played || 9 || 4 || 5
|-
|align=left| Games won  || 1 || – || 1
|-
|align=left| Games drawn|| 4 || 3 || 1
|-
|align=left| Games lost || 4 || 1 || 3
|-
|align=left| Biggest win|| 2–1 vs CSMS Iaşi || – || 2–1 vs CSMS Iaşi
|-
|align=left| Biggest loss || 1–2 vs Petrolul || 1–2 vs CFR Cluj || 1–2 vs Petrolul
|-
|align=left| Clean sheets || 0 || 0 || 0
|-
|align=left| Goals scored || 11 || 4 || 7
|-
|align=left| Goals conceded|| 14 || 5 || 9
|-
|align=left| Goal difference || -3 || -1 || -2
|-
|-
|-
|align=left| Yellow cards   || 26 || 9 || 17
|-
|align=left| Red cards      || 2 || 1 || 1
|-
|align=left| Most appearances || colspan=3| Giurgiu, Râpă, Štromajer (9)
|-
|align=left| Most minutes played ||colspan=3| Giurgiu, Râpă (849)
|-
|align=left| Top scorer     || colspan=3|  Viglianti (4)
|-
|align=left| Top assister   || colspan=3| Pena (3)
|-
|align=left| Points         || 7/27(%) || 3/12(%) || 4/15(%)
|-
|align=left| Winning rate   || % || % || %
|-

Liga I

League table

Results summary

Results by round

Points by opponent

Source: FCO

Matches
Kickoff times are in EET.

Cupa României

Friendlies

Netherlands training camp

Local friendlies

Spain training camp

Marbella Cup

Other friendlies

References

See also
FC Oțelul Galați
2012–13 Liga I
2012–13 Cupa României

2012-13
Otelul Galati season